Stateline Motel (also known as Last Chance, Motel of Fear and Last Chance for a Born Loser) is a 1973 Italian crime film directed by Maurizio Lucidi.

It is based on the novel of the same name written by Franco Enna.

Plot

Cast 
Eli Wallach as Joe
 Ursula Andress	as 		Michelle Nolton
 Fabio Testi	as 		Floyd
 Barbara Bach	as 		Emily
 Massimo Girotti	as 		Fred Norton
 Howard Ross	as 		Jack, the mechanic
 Carlo De Mejo	as Albert
 Céline Lomez	as Waitress

See also   
 List of Italian films of 1973

References

External links

1973 films
Films directed by Maurizio Lucidi
Films set in Canada
Films scored by Luis Bacalov
English-language Italian films
1970s English-language films
1970s Italian films